The Augustinianum College is a college founded in Milan, Italy in 1933 by Agostino Gemelli, in order to offer the opportunity to study at Università Cattolica del Sacro Cuore to the most capable among the resident students, providing a bed during their university studies.

Notable alumni
 Giuseppe Dossetti
 Amintore Fanfani
 Giovanni Maria Flick
 Luigi Gui
 Mario Mauro
 Ciriaco De Mita
 Paolo Prodi
 Romano Prodi

References

External links
 Official website

Università Cattolica del Sacro Cuore